Simon Clark (born 20 April 1958) is a horror novelist from Doncaster, England. He is the author of the novel The Night of the Triffids, the novella Humpty's Bones, and the short story Goblin City Lights, which have all won awards.

Most of his stories are based in Yorkshire, his home county. He also uses a technique that he calls "The Art of Wandering". The idea for Goblin City Lights arose from wandering in a London graveyard.

Biography 
Simon Clark was born on 20 April 1958 in Doncaster, England. He is married and has two children.

Clark began his career writing stories for fanzines. One of these was the semiprozine Back Brain Recluse (BBR). His first published collection of stories was Blood And Grit, published by BBR in 1990. In 1994 an editor named Nick Austin at Hodder Headline bought both Nailed by the Heart and Blood Crazy. An agent agreed to represent Clark. At this point, Clark decided to become a full-time writer.

After his seventh novel had been published in England, the American publisher Leisure Books republished his first book, Nailed by the Heart. Clark's first book for the American market, Darkness Demands, was set in the small English village of Skelbrooke, South Yorkshire.
Clark has also written prose material for U2 in the fan magazine Propaganda.

Major works

Vampyrrhic novels 
One of Clark's most popular novels, Vampyrrhic, has been followed by several sequels. Clark has said that he is not a fan of vampire novels. In the 1990s it was his view that vampires were becoming romantic, attractive figures. His intention in writing the book was to make the vampire loathsome, repellent, and ultra-violent again.

The Night of the Triffids 
The Night of the Triffids is Clark's sequel to The Day of the Triffids by John Wyndham. His agent contacted the trustees of Wyndham's estate, who agreed to the proposal.

Doctor Who  
Clark's Doctor Who novella, The Dalek Factor, was published by Telos Publishing just before the rights to publish Doctor Who were reacquired by the BBC. Around the same time, Clark was commissioned by the BBC to write a story for the second series of an animated Doctor Who series starring Richard E. Grant. This is the Doctor known as the Shalka Doctor. Three episodes were written before the commission was cancelled due to the imminent return of the live television series.

Awards 
In 2002 Clark won the British Fantasy Award for best short story, "Goblin City Lights", and best novel for The Night of the Triffids. "Goblin City Lights" originally appeared in Urban Gothic: Lacuna and Other Trips (2001), published by Telos Publishing. Clark said that the story first started when he wandered into a London graveyard, which he cites in an article, "The Art of Wandering", as a good example of his technique.

In 2011 he won the British Fantasy Award for best novella for Humpty's Bones.

Adaptations and other broadcasts
Clark's story "Six Men with Fire", a story about a picket-line during the UK miner's strike of 1984–1985 was read by Paul Copley on Morning Story on BBC Radio 4, on 27 July 1988.

A Big Finish Productions audio adaptation of The Night of the Triffids was released in September 2014. It stars Sam Troughton as David Masen.

Bibliography

Novels 
 His Vampyrrhic Bride (2012) Severn House Publishers, 
 Ghost Monster (2009) Leisure Books, 
 Vengeance Child (2009) Severn House Publishers, 
 Whitby Vampyrrhic (2009) Severn House Publishers, 
 The Midnight Man (2008) Severn House Publishers, 
 Lucifer's Ark (2007) Severn House Publishers, 
 This Rage of Echoes (2007) Robert Hale Ltd, 
 Death's Dominion (2006) Robert Hale Ltd, 
 London Under Midnight (2006) Severn House Publishers, 
 The Tower (2005) Robert Hale Ltd, 
 In This Skin (2004) Robert Hale Ltd, 
 Vampyrrhic Rites (2003) Hodder Headline, 
 Stranger (2002) Robert Hale Ltd, 
 Darkness Demands (2001) Leisure Books, 
 The Night of the Triffids (2001) Hodder Headline, 
 Judas Tree (1999) Hodder Headline, 
 The Fall (1998) Hodder Headline, 
 Vampyrrhic (1998) Hodder Headline, 
 King Blood (1997) Hodder Headline, 
 Darker (1996) Hodder Headline, 
 Blood Crazy (1995) Hodder Headline, reissued by Leisure Books, 2001, 
 Nailed by the Heart (1995) Hodder Headline, reissued by Leisure Books, 2000,

Novellas 
 Butterfly (2010) Cemetery Dance Publications, 
 Humpty's Bones (2010) Telos Publishing, 
 This Ghosting Tide (2009) Bad Moon Books, 
 Stone Cold Calling (2008) Tasmaniac Publications, 
 She Loves Monsters (2006) Necessary Evil Press, 
 Doctor Who: The Dalek Factor (2004) Telos Publishing,

Collections 
 Blood and Grit 21 (2011) BBR Solutions Ltd ASIN B0060734AK
 The Gravedigger's Tale (2010) Robert Hale Ltd 
 Midnight Bazaar – A Secret Arcade of Strange and Eerie Tales (2007) Robert Hale Ltd 
 Hotel Midnight (2005) Robert Hale Ltd 
 Salt Snake and Other Bloody Cuts (1999) Silver Salamander ASIN B000FNS0FO
 Blood & Grit (1990) BBR Books

Critical reactions 
Reviewers at Publishers Weekly have given Clark's works mixed reviews. The reviewer of Darker said it was "disappointing" and hoped Clark would do better next time. The reviewer of Whitby Vampyrrhic called the novel a "cookie-cutter story of an English town infested by the undead".

However, His Vampyrrhic Bride was described as "romantic without being soppy or sentimental", and "a palate cleanser for horror readers tired of the same old blood-suckers". The Night of the Triffids was said to be "a crafty continuation" of The Day of the Triffids, being "more literary than many books of its ilk" and a "truly enjoyable voyage". The reviewer for Death's Dominion wrote that "all the monster-burning, skull-crushing, village-razing, castle-raiding fun ... make for a satisfying son of Frankenstein".

References

External links 
 
 Author's original website archived at the British Library
 

1958 births
Living people
People from Doncaster
English writers
English male novelists